The Jagdtiger ("Hunting Tiger"; officially designated Panzerjäger Tiger Ausf. B) is a German casemate-type heavy tank destroyer (Jagdpanzer) of World War II. It was built upon the slightly lengthened chassis of a Tiger II. Its ordnance inventory designation was Sd.Kfz. 186.

The 72-tonne Jagdtiger was the heaviest armored fighting vehicle (AFV) used operationally by any nation in WWII and the heaviest combat vehicle of any type to be produced during the conflict. it was armed with a 128 mm Pak 44 L/55 main gun which could out-range and defeat any AFV fielded by the Allied forces.

It saw brief service in small numbers from late 1944 until the end of the war on both the Western and Eastern Front. Although 150 were ordered, only around 80 were produced. Due to an excessive weight and an underpowered drivetrain system, the Jagdtiger was plagued with mobility and mechanical problems. Three Jagdtigers survive in museums.

Development 
With the success of the StuG III, Marder I, Marder II, and Marder III  , the military leadership of Nazi Germany decided to use the chassis of existing armored fighting vehicles as the basis for self-propelled guns (serving as assault guns and tank destroyers). German tank destroyers of World War II used fixed casemates instead of fully rotatable turrets to significantly reduce the cost, weight, and materials necessary for mounting large-caliber guns.

In early 1942, a request was made by the Army General Staff to mount a 128 mm gun on a self-propelled armored chassis. Firing tests of the 128 mm gun showed it to have a high percentage of hits; smaller caliber guns, such as the ubiquitous 88 mm and the slightly larger 105 mm, were also tested.

By early 1943, a decision was made to install a 128 mm gun on either a Panther or Tiger I chassis as a heavy assault gun. The Panther chassis was considered unsuitable after a wooden mockup of the design was constructed. On 20 October 1943, another wooden mockup was constructed on a Tiger II heavy tank chassis, and presented to Hitler in East Prussia. Two prototypes were produced: One was a version fitted with the eight-roadwheel Porsche suspension system (serial number 305001) and another version was equipped with the Henschel nine-overlapping roadwheel suspension system (serial number 305002), as used on the main-production Tiger IIs constructed by Henschel. They were completed in February 1944.

Design 

The  used a boxy superstructure, with its sides integral with the hull sides, on top of a lengthened Tiger II chassis. The resulting vehicle featured very heavy armor. The main gun mount had a limited traverse of only 10 degrees; the entire vehicle had to be turned to aim outside that narrow field of fire.

The  suffered from a variety of mechanical and technical problems due to its immense weight and under-powered engine. The vehicle had frequent breakdowns; ultimately more  were lost to mechanical problems or lack of fuel than to enemy action.

Production 

One hundred and fifty  were initially ordered but only between 70 and 85 were produced at the Nibelungenwerk at St. Valentin, from July 1944 to May 1945. Eleven of them, serial numbers 305001 and 305003 to 305012, were produced with the Porsche suspension (with eight road wheels per side); all the rest used the Henschel suspension with nine road wheels per side. 

Details and production locations were known to the Allies through the resistance group around the later executed priest Heinrich Maier. Prisoners from the St. Valentin concentration camp were used to build the tank. 

Production figures vary depending on source and other factors such as if prototypes are included and if those made after VE day are included: approximately 48 from July 1944 to the end of December 1944; 36 from January to April 1945, serial numbers from 305001 to 305088.

After serial number 305011 (September 1944), no Zimmerit anti-magnetic paste was factory applied.

Combat history 

About 20% were lost in combat, with most destroyed by their crews when abandoned because of breakdowns or lack of fuel.

The gun used two-part ammunition, which meant that the main projectile and the cased propellant-charge were loaded into the breech separately. Two loaders were tasked with this work, one for each type.

His postwar memoir Tigers in the Mud provides a history of the 10  under his command. The vehicle was slow, having the same engine as the already-underpowered Tiger I and Tiger II. The vehicles' transmissions and differentials broke down easily because the whole 72-tonne vehicle needed to rotate for the gun's traverse. The enormous 128 mm main-gun had to be locked down during the vehicle's maneuvers, otherwise its mounting-brackets would wear out too much for accurate firing afterwards. This meant a crew-member had to exit the vehicle in combat and unlock the gun from its frontally mounted gun travel-lock before firing. Carius recorded that, in combat, a 128 mm projectile went through the walls of a house and destroyed an American tank behind it.

Insufficient training of vehicle crews and their poor morale during the last stage of the war were the biggest problems for  crewmen under Carius's command. Both vehicles broke down while hurriedly withdrawing through fear of the supposed air attack that did not materialize and one was then subsequently destroyed by its crew. To prevent such a disaster, at Siegen, Carius himself dug in his command vehicle on high ground. An approaching American armored column avoided his ambush because nearby German civilians warned them of it. Later, one of his vehicles fell into a bomb crater at night and was disabled while another was lost to a  attack by friendly  militia troops who had never seen a  before and mistook it for an Allied vehicle.

The first  lost in combat was during the failed Operation Nordwind offensive in France in 1945. Despite its heavy armour, this  was lost to American infantry using a bazooka, which at the time was considered ineffective against such a massive vehicle.

Near Unna, one  climbed a hill to attack five American tanks 600 meters away, leading to two withdrawing and the other three opening fire. However, the inexperienced German commander lost his nerve and turned around instead of backing down, thus exposing the thinner side armor, which was penetrated and all six crew members killed. Carius wrote that the crews were not trained or experienced enough to keep their thick frontal armour facing the enemy in combat.

When unable to escape the Ruhr Pocket, Carius ordered the guns of the remaining  destroyed to prevent intact vehicles falling into Allied hands and then surrendered to American forces. The 10  of the 2nd Company of  512 destroyed one American tank for one  lost to combat, one lost to friendly fire, and eight others lost to mechanical breakdown or destruction by their own crews to prevent capture by enemy forces.

On 17 January 1945, two  used by the  XIV Corps engaged a bunker-line in support of assaulting infantry near Auenheim. On 18 January, they attacked four secure bunkers at a range of 1,000 meters. The armored cupola of one bunker burned out after two shots. A Sherman attacking in a counter-thrust was set afire by explosive shells. The two Jagdtigers survived the fight, having fired 46 explosive shells and 10 anti-tank shells.

In April 1945,  512 saw a great deal of action, especially on 9 April, where the 1st Company engaged an Allied column of Sherman tanks and trucks from hull-down positions and destroyed 11 tanks and over 30 unarmored or lightly armored targets, with some of the enemy tanks knocked out from a distance of more than 4,000 m. The unit lost one  in this incident, after Allied Republic P-47 Thunderbolt fighter-bombers appeared. During the next couple of days, the 1st Company destroyed a further five Sherman tanks before surrendering to US troops at Iserlohn. Meanwhile, the 2nd Company fought on with little gain. On 15 April 1945, the unit surrendered at Schillerplatz in Iserlohn.

Survivors 
Three  survive, in US, UK and Russian museums:

  (serial number 305004): The Tank Museum in England. One of the 11 Porsche–designed suspension-equipped variants, it was captured by British troops in April 1945 near the armour proving ground at Sennelager, Germany, where it was undergoing testing and trials. The third wheel-station (paired-wheel bogie) on the left side is missing. Zimmerit was applied to approximately 2 meters high on the superstructure and the German Balkenkreuz was painted in the mid-section of the vehicle's casemate's side. The earlier 18-tooth drive-sprocket version is found on this vehicle (later vehicles had 9-tooth drive sprockets).
 (serial number 305020): National Armor & Cavalry Museum in Fort Benning, Georgia. It was produced in October 1944 and was attached to the 3rd Company of the  653, bearing the vehicle-number of 331. It was captured by American troops near , Germany in March 1945. Shell damage is still visible on the gun mantlet, glacis plate and lower-nose armor. This vehicle used the later-version nine-tooth drive sprockets for use with the 'contact shoe' and 'connector link'-style continuous track it shared with the Tiger II on which it was based.
 Jagdtiger (serial number 305083): Kubinka Tank Museum near Moscow. This , not coated with Zimmerit, was acquired in mint condition with complete sideskirts and the later nine-tooth drive sprockets. Twelve hooks on both sides of the superstructure were designed to carry six pairs of track-links (the spare track-links are now missing on this vehicle). All of the Jagdtiger's repair-tools are also missing, but it still retains the MG 42 anti-aircraft gun mount on the rear engine-deck (recent photographs show that this specific machine gun-mount has since been removed, leaving only its mounting-base).

Variants 
Aside from the 11 early vehicles with a Porsche suspension, the only variant developed was the Sd.Kfz.185.

8.8 cm PaK 43 Jagdtiger – The difference was that the gun used was the 8.8 cm Pak 43 rather than the 12.8 cm Pak 44. This was due to shortages of the latter weapon. The variant did not enter production .

See also
List of WWII Maybach engines
Sturer Emil

Tanks of comparable role, performance and era
American T28 Super Heavy Tank - A comparable US project, two prototypes built.
British Tortoise heavy assault tank - A comparable British project, few prototypes built.
Soviet ISU-152 and ISU-122 - Heavy tank-based assault guns that frequently found themselves employed as heavy tank destroyers
Soviet SU-100Y - Another SPG used as tank destroyer

References 
Notes

Citations

Bibliography

External links 
Achtung Panzer! 
Battletanks.com
Panzerworld
Surviving Tiger tanks - A PDF file presenting the Tiger tanks (Tiger I, Kingtiger, Jagdtiger and Sturmtiger) still existing in the world

World War II tank destroyers of Germany
Military vehicles introduced from 1940 to 1944